The Hun Sen Cup is the main football knockout tournament in Cambodia. It involves the Cambodian League and provincial teams organized by the Football Federation of Cambodia. The 2015 Hun Sen Cup was the 9th season. National Police Commissary were the defending champions, having beaten Build Bright United 2–0 in the previous season's final.

Qualifying round
There were 19 teams from Phnom Penh and other provinces divided into six regions. The remaining eight teams came from a qualifying round, with the eight teams (rank 1 to 8) of the Cambodian League 2014 entering the group stage.
 Phnom Penh Region (arranged in Phnom Penh): Eight teams in two groups, the top one of each group with the one best second-ranked team going through to the group stage.

Group A: National Defense, Western Phnom Penh, Civil Aviation and Khan Chbar Ampov. (Qualified team: National Defense)

Group B: Kirivong Sok Sen Chey, Albirex Niigata Phnom Penh, Khan Toul Kok and Khan Chroy Changvar. (Qualified teams: Kirivong Sok Sen Chey and Albirex Niigata Phnom Penh)
 East Region (arranged in Prey Veng): Prey Veng, Thbong Khmum and Kandal (Qualified team: Prey Veng)
 Centre Region (arranged in Kampong Thom): Kampong Thom, Siem Reap and Oddar Meanchey (Qualified team: Siem Reap)
 West Region: Qualified team Battambang, only one team participated.
 North Region: Qualified team Kratie, only one team participated.
 South Region (arranged in Takeo): Takeo, Kep and Kampot (Qualified team: Kampot)

Group stage
The teams finishing in the top two positions in each of the four groups (highlighted in tables) in the group stage progressed to the quarter-finals.

Group A

Group B

Group C

Group D

Quarter-finals

Semi-finals

Third place play-off

Final

Awards
 Top goal scorer (The golden boot): Prak Mony Udom of Svay Rieng FC (24 goals)
 Goalkeeper of the season (the golden glove): Am Sovannarath of Svay Rieng FC
 Fair Play: National Police Commissary

See also
 2015 Cambodian League
 Cambodian League
 Hun Sen Cup

References

Hun Sen Cup seasons
2015 in Cambodian football
2015 domestic association football cups